Bullion is a ghost town in Elko County, in the American state of Nevada.

History
Bullion was established in 1870 after the discovery of silver. Several smelters were built in the town. In 1871, Bullion had a hotel, two saloons, a merchandise store, and 12 houses, three years after Bullion started a period of great crisis with a great exodus of population. At present nothing remains but large slag heaps, smelter foundations, stone ruins, and a small cemetery.

References

Ghost towns in Elko County, Nevada
Ghost towns in Nevada